B. formosa may refer to:

 Banksia formosa, a shrub endemic to Western Australia
 Belvosia formosa, a tachina fly
 Bematistes formosa, an African butterfly
 Billbergia formosa, a New World plant
 Bucculatrix formosa, a ribbed cocoon maker
 Burmeistera formosa, a plant endemic to Ecuador